Cerezo de Arriba is a municipality located in the province of Segovia, Castile and León, Spain.
La Pinilla is a ski area located in Cerezo de Arriba.

See also
 Cerezo de Abajo

References

Municipalities in the Province of Segovia